The State of the Art is a short story collection by Scottish writer Iain M. Banks, first published in 1991. The collection includes some stories originally published under his other byline "Iain Banks", as well as the title novella and others set in Banks's Culture fictional universe.

The non-SF stories in the collection are the only non-SF stories published under his Iain M. Banks name.

Editions
The collection was published in the US in 2004 by Night Shade Books, in hardback and limited editions. The limited edition contains work by Banks not found in the UK version. A Trade Paperback edition was printed in Canada in 2007 by Night Shade Books, It contains the additional text 'A Few Notes on the Culture'.

Contents
 "Road of Skulls". Originally published in the anthology 20 under 35, Peter Straus (ed.) 1988, Sceptre, .
Two men in a carriage travel over the eponymous Road of Skulls, to reach a distant City that seems to be constantly retreating and producing the infinite road.
 "A Gift from the Culture". Originally published in Interzone #20, Summer 1987 with illustrations by SMS.
A man in self-imposed exile from the Culture is pressured into committing an act of terrorism with the help of Culture technology.
 "Odd Attachment". Originally published in the anthology Arrows of Eros, Alex Stewart (ed.) 1989, New English Library, .
A lovesick alien encounters a humanoid explorer, and mutilates it in a game of "loves me, loves me not."
 "Descendant". Originally published in the anthology Tales from the Forbidden Planet, Roz Kaveney (ed.) 1987, Titan Books, .
A Culture soldier and his sapient spacesuit struggle to survive after being shot down and crash-landing on a barren planet.
 "Cleaning Up". Originally published in a limited edition of 500 by Birmingham Science Fiction Group as the Souvenir Book for Novacon 17 (1987) when Banks was Guest of Honour.
An alien race discovers that a faulty teleporter has been sending junk onto the surface of Earth instead of the Sun, where scientists from across the world have been studying these "Gifts." The aliens covertly work with national authorities to recover the futuristic technologies. The last Gift to arrive is the malfunctioning teleporter itself, which the United States attempts to use for a first strike against the USSR. The teleporter fails and randomly sends nuclear devices across the world, devastating several nations.
 "Piece". Originally published in The Observer Magazine on 13 August 1989 with illustrations by Peter Knock.
A commentary on religion and fundamentalism in the form of a recovered letter from the Lockerbie disaster.
 "The State of the Art". An original edition appeared in 1989 as a separate book (Mark V. Ziesing). The cover art was by Arnie Fenner, and a limited edition of 400 books in a slipcase appeared, signed by both artist and author.
At 100 pages long, the title novella makes up the bulk of the book. The novella chronicles a Culture mission to Earth in the late 1970s, and also serves as a prequel of sorts to Use of Weapons by featuring two of that novel's characters, Diziet Sma and the drone Skaffen-Amtiskaw. Here, Sma argues for contact with Earth, to try to fix the mess the human species has made of it; another Culture citizen, Linter, goes native, choosing to renounce his Culture body enhancements so as to be more like the locals; and Li, who is a Star Trek fan, argues that the whole "incontestably neurotic and clinically insane species" should be eradicated with a micro black hole. The ship Arbitrary has ideas, and a sense of humour, of its own: "Also while I'd been away, the ship had sent a request on a postcard to the BBC's World Service, asking for 'Mr David Bowie's "Space Oddity" for the good ship Arbitrary and all who sail in her.' (This from a machine that could have swamped Earth's entire electro-magnetic spectrum with whatever the hell it wanted from somewhere beyond Betelgeuse.) It didn't get the request played. The ship thought this was hilarious."
"Scratch". Originally published in The Fiction Magazine vol. 6, No. 6, Jul/Aug 1987.
A stream-of-consciousness narrative that samples random sections of the future, eventually ending in an abrupt nuclear apocalypse. The following text that opens the story is simultaneously the title and part of the text: "OR: The Present and Future of Species HS (sic) Considered as The Contents of a Contemporary Popular Record (qv). Report Abstract/Extract Version 4.2 Begins (after this break);"

Adaptations
"Piece" was adapted by Craig Warner for BBC Radio 5 and broadcast on 6 June 1991. It was directed by John York. The cast included:
Munro - Bill Paterson
Jack - Harry Jones
Eve/Voice - Susan Sheridan

"The State of the Art" was adapted by Paul Cornell for the Afternoon Play slot on BBC Radio 4 and broadcast on 5 March 2009. The adaptation was directed by Nadia Molinari and the main cast was:
The Ship - Antony Sher
Diziet Sma - Nina Sosanya
Dervley Linter - Paterson Joseph
Li - Graeme Hawley
Tel - Brigit Forsyth
Sodel - Conrad Nelson

In late 2009 it was announced that the story "A Gift From the Culture" was in the early stages of being adapted for the cinema by Dominic Murphy, the director of White Lightnin'.

Reception 
In 1990 Mike Christie reviewed the collection for Foundation. Christie called the collection a "rare success" in the genre of utopian fiction, successfully merging the styles of political utopia and "high-tech sf". He praises Banks for showing a cast of believable, imperfect characters, who in turn make his utopia - the world of The Culture - more realistic.

References

Bibliography
 (paperback ).

External links
Danny Yee's review
Reviews

1989 short story collections
The Culture
Science fiction short story collections
Scottish novels
Scottish short story collections
Space opera novels